Clinton Earl Portis (born September 1, 1981) is an American former professional football player who was a running back in the National Football League (NFL) for nine seasons. He played college football for the Miami Hurricanes.  He was drafted by the Denver Broncos in the second round of the 2002 NFL Draft.  Portis was best known for being the starting running back for the Washington Redskins for seven seasons, in which he gained an average of 81.2 yards rushing per game, for which a select panel of celebrities included him as one of the 80 Greatest Redskins.

College career

Portis attended the University of Miami, where he played for the Hurricanes. He considered going to the University of South Carolina but a fight that he had at Gainesville High School resulted in his scholarship being taken away. He became just the second true freshman to start at running back since the 1975 season. Portis set a school freshman record with five 100-yard performances, and led the team with 838 yards and eight touchdowns on 143 carries (5.9 avg.) in 10 games. He also caught four passes for 44 yards (11.0 avg.) and 2 touchdowns.  When Portis was still a relative unknown, Lee Corso singled out Portis's performance during a defeat by Florida State for hustling and never giving up, saying "that kid can play for me any time".

Portis' sophomore season was not as successful as he lost his job to James Jackson and rushed for 485 yards and two touchdowns on 77 carries (6.3 avg.) in eight games. He also added 103 yards on five receptions (20.6 avg.).

However, Portis bounced back in 2001 as the Hurricanes won the National Championship and Portis had his best season rushing for 1,200 yards and 10 touchdowns on 220 carries (5.5 avg.). He also added 125 receiving yards. In the Rose Bowl against Nebraska, Portis ran for 104 yards and a touchdown.  He also had a long touchdown reception called back on a holding call.

Clinton was inducted into the UM Sports Hall of Fame on April 10, 2014 at a ceremony in Miami.

Track and field
Portis was also a standout track athlete for the Gainesville High School track team. He was timed at 10.6 seconds in the 100 meters. He was member of the varsity track team. He took part in the state record 4 x 100 meter relay team, that finished with a time of 40.8 seconds. He also posted a personal bests of 2.01 meters in the high jump, and 6.91 meters in the long jump.

He also ran track and field for the University of Miami, where he won the state championship in the 4x400-meter relay. He also recorded personal best of 6.93 seconds in the 60 meters and 21.82 seconds in the 200 meters.

Personal bests

College statistics

Professional career

2002 NFL Draft

Portis was drafted by the Denver Broncos with the 51st overall pick in the second round of the 2002 NFL Draft.

Denver Broncos
Portis rushed for over 1,500 yards in each of his first two seasons with the Broncos, averaging 5.5 yards per carry in that span. The latter is an NFL record for a running back's first two seasons. On December 15, 2002, Portis became the youngest player (21 years, 105 days) to score 4 touchdowns in a game in a 31-24 victory over the Kansas City Chiefs. He has the most single game fantasy point total, with 55.4. The very next season on December 7, 2003, Portis  became the youngest player (22 years, 97 days) to score 5 touchdowns in a game in a 45-27 victory, which also happened against Kansas City.

's NFL off-season, Clinton Portis held at least 18 Broncos franchise records, including:
 Rush Yards: rookie season (1,508 in 2002)
 Rush Yds/Att: career (5.5), season (5.52 in 2002), game (9.91 on 2003-12-07 KAN), rookie season (5.52 in 2002), rookie game (9.5 on 2002-12-29 ARI)
 Rushing TDs: game (5 on 2003-12-07 KAN), rookie season (15 in 2002)
 Rush Yds/Game: career (106.9)
 Total TDs: game (5 on 2003-12-07 KAN), rookie season (17 in 2002), rookie game (4 on 2002-12-15 KAN; with Mike Anderson)
 Yards from Scrimmage: rookie season (1,872 in 2002)
 All Purpose Yards: rookie season (1,872 in 2002)
 100+ yard rushing games: rookie season (8)
 Games with 1+ TD scored: rookie season (10)
 Games with 2+ TD scored: rookie season (5; with Mike Anderson)
 Games with 3+ TD scored: rookie season (1; with Jon Keyworth, Terrell Davis and Mike Anderson)

Trade
Before the 2004 season, the Broncos traded Portis to the Washington Redskins for cornerback Champ Bailey and a second-round draft pick in the 2004 NFL Draft which the Broncos used to select Tatum Bell (and Bell wore Portis's number 26 in Denver). Washington signed Portis to an eight-year contract worth $50.5 million. At that time, there were criticisms regarding the trade, namely that shut-down corners like Bailey were hard to come by and that adding a second-round pick for Portis was too much and one-sided. Critics also felt that Portis was simply a product of the Broncos' O-line scheme, and would not have much success in Washington, which was usually suited to more physical, power runners (such as Stephen Davis or John Riggins).

Washington Redskins

2004
In the 2004 season, he had to adjust to coach Joe Gibbs' style of running, which consists of mostly power running. Despite taking his first Washington carry 64 yards for a TD in the season opener against the Tampa Bay Buccaneers, it was a somewhat rough adjustment for Portis because Denver's running style consisted of stretch runs and runs to the outside. The adjustment was made rougher by an offensive line that was depleted mainly due to injuries. He finished 2004 with 1,315 yards for a 3.8 yard rushing average. He had an especially tough time finding the end zone, finishing with eight total touchdowns (5 rushing, 2 receiving, and one passing).

2005
Portis bounced back in the 2005 season. Although Gibbs still ran a power style of football, he implemented more outside running plays into the Washington rushing attack to better suit Portis' style of running. Portis had a much better season, proving that he can run inside as well as to the outside and was a better pass-blocker. Although he did not get into the end zone until the fifth game of the season, he finished strong and had 12 total touchdowns (11 rushing and one passing). On a 14-yard run against the Philadelphia Eagles on January 1, 2006, he broke the Redskins' franchise record for the most rushing yards in a season with 1,516 yards and tied the most 100+ yard games in a season (5). He ended the game with 112 rushing yards. By rushing for 1,516 yards, he became only the third runner in league history to reach 1,500 yards in three of his first four seasons.

2006
Portis demonstrated his speed during the 2006 Washington Redskins training camp, running a 4.26 second 40-yard dash. Shortly following that, on August 13, 2006, Portis suffered a partially dislocated shoulder in the first quarter of a Week 1 pre-season game after tackling Cincinnati Bengals cornerback Keiwan Ratliff following a Bengals interception. After the injury, Portis said: "I don't know why myself or any other player of my caliber should be playing in the preseason." He added, "I think for the last four years I've done enough to show the world I'm going to be ready for the season."

There was no immediate indication from the Redskins as to when Portis might return to active playing status. However, he returned early into Washington' game against the Minnesota Vikings, where he gained 39 yards on 10 carries with one touchdown. The Washington Redskins lost 16-19, the clock expiring as Washington kicker John Hall missed wide left on a field goal. Portis rebounded in following weeks with 16 carries for 86 yards and 2 touchdowns against the Houston Texans, and 27 carries for 112 yards and a touchdown against the Jacksonville Jaguars.

Nagged by injuries all season, Portis suffered another setback in the first quarter of Washington's November 12 loss to the Philadelphia Eagles. Portis left the game with a hand injury and was replaced by backup Ladell Betts. X-rays revealed that Portis broke his right hand during the game. He was operated on and placed on the Redskins' Injured Reserve list three days later, on November 15.

2007

Washington agreed to guarantee Portis' 2008-2009 and a large portion of his 2010 base salaries in March. This would equal up to $15 million in guarantees. Portis, also got a $9.32 million "signing bonus" upon restructuring. He would finish the 2007 season with 1,262 yards rushing and 11 rushing touchdowns along with 389 yards receiving.

2008
In 2008, Portis fell just short of what would have been his fourth 1500 yard rushing season in seven years, finishing with 1487 yards and an average of 4.3 yards per carry.  His season was highlighted by a five-week stretch in which Portis gained nearly 700 yards, ending in an October 26 victory over the Detroit Lions. During this span Clinton Portis joined O.J. Simpson as the only players in NFL history to rush for at least 120 yards in five consecutive games twice in a career (Portis first did it over two seasons with four games with Denver in 2003 and one game with Washington in 2004).  Portis led the NFL in rushing as late as November 23 before nagging injuries and limited playing time slowed him down; he gained only 281 yards in his final five games as Washington lost four of five to miss the playoffs. Despite this, he was selected to the Pro Bowl over DeAngelo Williams, despite Williams having better stats at the end of the season.

Some controversy was caused on December 9, 2008 when Clinton Portis made negative statements about Washington coach Jim Zorn in his weekly appearance on WTEM-AM radio, criticizing Zorn for giving inconsistent messages and sarcastically calling him a "genius." Portis was still smarting from his lack of playing time in Sunday's 24-10 loss to the Baltimore Ravens, when he was removed from the game after the first series of the second half.
  In the offseason, Portis stated that he tried to forge a better relationship with Zorn, but admitted that he did not have the rapport that he shared with former head coach Joe Gibbs, which he classified as a "great relationship," and stated that Gibbs was "one of the best men as far as guidance, or the way he lives his life, an example of a true champion."

2009
During a Week 9 game versus the Atlanta Falcons, Portis suffered a concussion. The hit caused Portis to lose consciousness and leave the game. Portis missed four consecutive games with concussion-like symptoms. Portis went to see a specialist in Pittsburgh, Pennsylvania on December 1, 2009. It was reported that on December 8, Portis was officially placed on injured reserve.  It took four months for him to gain clearance to play again.

2010
The start of the 2010 season saw the reunion of Portis and newly appointed coach, Mike Shanahan, Portis' former coach from his first two career seasons with the Denver Broncos.  Despite a positive outlook with a new coaching staff, injuries continued to plague Portis as he had to deal with abdomen and groin injuries.  During his seventh year as a Redskin, Portis played only five games and tallied only 227 yards rushing throughout the season, which included two touchdowns.  Both touchdowns were scored in the September 19 home game versus the Houston Texans.

2011
On February 28, 2011, Portis was released by the Washington Redskins after failed contract re-negotiations and repeated injuries. Following his release, Portis felt that passion had been missing from the team since Gibbs retired, saying, "I never seen nobody give up or with their head down with Coach Gibbs. As many close games as we played...you can't say one time that we gave up. There was a passion and toughness amongst everybody on that field to fight until time expired."

Retirement
On August 21, 2012, Portis announced his retirement, cementing his status as 27th all-time in career rushing yards. He officially retired on August 23 and during the press conference it was announced that he made it into the list of the 80 Greatest Redskins of All-Time.  After retirement, Portis admitted to have suffered 10 concussions.  In 2013, Portis joined former players such as Daunte Culpepper, Cadillac Williams and Art Monk in a civil lawsuit against NFL over concussion and head injuries.

NFL career statistics

In popular culture
During his career with the Washington Redskins, Portis made several appearances in TV commercials for Easterns Automotive Group, a local car dealership group on the DC and Baltimore areas, alongside Jason Campbell, Antwaan Randle El and Chris Cooley.

Portis' Washington Redskins Jersey was featured prominently in the 2007 film Transformers, worn by actor Anthony Anderson's character Glen Whitmann.

Personal life
Portis is the cousin of former Washington Valor quarterback Josh Portis.

Due to mismanagement by his financial advisors that caused him to lose multiple homes, Portis filed for bankruptcy protection in December 2015, and as of 2017 lived in a two-bedroom apartment in Northern Virginia. In a 2017 interview with Sports Illustrated, Portis admitted that he contemplated murdering his former advisors.

Criminal fraud
In December 2019, Portis was named as one of 12 former NFL players accused of defrauding the league's health program by filing a total of $3.9 million in false claims. He was charged with one count of conspiracy to commit wire fraud and health care fraud, one count of wire fraud, and one count of health care fraud by the United States Department of Justice. He pleaded not guilty to the charges in February 2020. He was indicted on the same charges in a superseding case on July 24, 2020. In September 2021, the Department of Justice announced that Portis had pleaded guilty to obtaining $99,264 in benefits for medical equipment that was not actually provided. He was sentenced on January 6, 2022, to six months in prison and an additional six months of home confinement beginning in March 2022.

Controversial views 
In May 2007, during the ongoing investigations into the dog-fighting crimes of former NFL player Michael Vick, Portis defended Vick, saying: "I don't know if he was fighting dogs or not. But it’s his property; it’s his dogs. If that’s what he wants to do, do it." When told that dog fighting was a felony, Portis replied, "It can't be too bad of a crime." Portis said that he thought dog fighting was a “prevalent” part of life, adding: "I know a lot of back roads that got a dog fight if you want to go see it. But they’re not bothering those people because those people are not big names." That same day, he later released a statement through the Redskins' official website that claimed he did not take part in, nor condone, dog fighting.

References

External links
 

1981 births
Living people
African-American players of American football
American Conference Pro Bowl players
American football running backs
Denver Broncos players
Gainesville High School (Florida) alumni
Miami Hurricanes football players
National Football League Offensive Rookie of the Year Award winners
Players of American football from Gainesville, Florida
People from Laurel, Mississippi
Washington Redskins players
21st-century African-American sportspeople
20th-century African-American people